BN, Bn or bn may refer to:

Businesses and organizations
 RTV BN, a Bosnian Serb TV network
 Bangladesh Navy
 Barisan Nasional (also known as "National Front"), a political coalition in Malaysia
 Barnes & Noble, an American specialty retailer specializing in bookstore/coffeeshop venues
 Braniff International Airways (IATA code BN), a former American airline in service from 1928 to 1982
 British Naturism, the official national naturist society in the United Kingdom
 Britten-Norman, a British manufacturer, based on the Isle of Wight, producing Islander and Trislander aircraft
 La Brugeoise et Nivelles, a Belgian railway rolling stock manufacturer, now part of Alstom
 Burlington Northern Railroad, a United States railroad that operated from 1970 to 1996
 Groupe Danone (uronext stock exchange code BN), a French food-products multinational
 Horizon Airlines (Australia) (IATA code BN), a former Australian airline, ending service in 2004
 Banque Nationale (disambiguation) several banks
 Banca Nuova, Italian bank
 Bandai Namco, a video game company

Places
 Bahrain (WMO country code: BN), an island nation in the Persian Gulf
 Benin (FIPS 10-4 and obsolete NATO digram country code: BN), a country in Western Africa
 Bloomington-Normal, Illinois, United States
 BN postcode area centred on Brighton, England
 Brunei (ISO 3166 country code: BN), a country on the island of Borneo in Southeast Asia
 Bandarban a district in South-Eastern Bangladesh
Province of Benevento, an Italian province with the area code BN

In science and technology
 .bn, Internet country code top-level domain (ccTLD) for Brunei
 Benzyl functional group ('Bn'), in organic chemistry
 Boron nitride, a chemical compound composed of boron and nitrogen
 Bulimia nervosa, an eating disorder
 Dynkin diagram Bn, in the mathematical field of Lie theory
BN-reactor - Russian fast breeder reactors
 Batch normalization

Other uses
 BN (biscuit), a type of biscuit with fillings
 Bachelor of Nursing, an academic and professional degree
 Bacon Number (a measure of an actor's professional proximity to Kevin Bacon)
 Baitun Nur Mosque, in Calgary, Alberta, Canada
 Battalion, in military use
 Bengali language (ISO 639 alpha-2 language code: bn), an Indo-Aryan language of East South Asia
 Billion (disambiguation)